Stéphane Lafleur (born 1976)
is a French-Canadian film director, editor and musician.

Career
Lafleur attended the Université du Québec à Montréal. In 1999, he directed his first short film, Karaoke, which received an honorable mention for the Best Canadian Short Film award at the 1999 Toronto International Film Festival. He released his second short film, Snooze, in 2002.

In 2007, he directed his first feature film, Continental, a Film Without Guns (Continental, un film sans fusil), which premiered at the Venice Film Festival. The film won the Jutra Award for direction and screenwriting as well as the Best Canadian First Feature at TIFF.

His second film, Familiar Grounds (En terrains connus), was released in 2011. In the same year, he collaborated with musicians Andre Ethier, Mathieu Charbonneau and Rebecca Foon on Prince Albert, a short film released as part of the National Parks Project.

His third feature film, You're Sleeping Nicole (Tu dors Nicole), premiered at the 2014 Cannes Film Festival.

As an editor, he won the Genie Award for Best Achievement in Editing in 2011 for Monsieur Lazhar.

As a musician, he is a member of the folk-rock band Avec pas d'casque.

In 2015 he was the patron and curator of the Festival Vues dans la tête de... film festival in Rivière-du-Loup.

Filmography

As director
 1999 - Karaoke (short)
 2002 - Snooze (short)
 2007 - Continental, a Film Without Guns (Continental, un film sans fusil)
 2011 - Familiar Grounds (En terrains connus)
 2011 - Prince Albert (short)
 2014 - You're Sleeping Nicole (Tu dors Nicole)
 2022 - Viking

As writer 
 2007 - Continental, a Film Without Guns (Continental, un film sans fusil)
 2011 - Familiar Grounds (En terrains connus)
 2014 - You're Sleeping, Nicole (Tu dors Nicole)

As film editor 
 2003 - Me Bob Robert
 2005 - Peter and the Penny
 2008 - Gilles
 2011 - Monsieur Lazhar
 2013 - The Dismantling (Le Démantèlement)
 2015 - O Negative
 2016 - Mutants
 2019 - I'll End Up in Jail (Je finirai en prison)
 2020 - Shooting Star (Comme une comète)

References

External links

Film directors from Quebec
Canadian screenwriters in French
Canadian film editors
Living people
Université du Québec à Montréal alumni
Best Editing Genie and Canadian Screen Award winners
Date of birth missing (living people)
Place of birth missing (living people)
Canadian folk musicians
Canadian songwriters
Writers from Quebec
Musicians from Quebec
1976 births
Best Director Jutra and Iris Award winners